The IMC University of Applied Sciences Krems is a private Austrian university. Founded in 1994, IMC Krems has three campuses in Krems, Austria.

IMC Krems offers 27-degree programmes, and has 2,700 students, 560 lecturers, as well as 137 partner universities in 36 countries. With three locations in and around Krems, the university offers bachelor and master's degree programmes in business, health sciences and life sciences.

Besides full-time courses, some programmes are also offered in a part-time format. Professional development training courses in languages and hospital hygiene are also available.

History 
IMC Krems was founded in 1994 as International Management Center GmbH (IMC), after the Fachhochschul-Studiengesetz Act in (University of Applied Sciences Studies Act) 1993 opened the way for private-sector institutions to provide university degree programmes. It started with an English language degree programme in Tourism and Leisure Management that included a compulsory semester abroad in an internship – a first in Austria.

In 1999, IMC Krems started the Export-Oriented Management EU-ASEAN-NAFTA degree programme. Two further programmes, Health Management, and Business Administration and E-Business Management for SMEs, were launched in 2001. IMC Krems was awarded the status of university of applied sciences by the Austrian Federal Ministry of Education, Science and Culture in April 2002.  In the same year, the Medical and Pharmaceutical Biotechnology degree programme was introduced, followed by the opening of the biotechnology centre in March 2003. The IMC Krems second part-time degree programme, Health Management, began in September 2003 with 30 students.

IMC Krems expanded to a second location, wings D and G at the new Campus Krems, in 2005. Degree programmes in Physiotherapy and Midwifery were added to the curriculum in 2006. In 2008 the university launched the Advanced Nursing Practice bachelor programme, while the Music Therapy programme started in 2009. The foundation stone for the new wing G1 at Campus Krems was laid in May 2011.

IMC Krems added five master's degree programmesin September 2011:

 Marketing and Sales, 
 Management of Health Institutions, 
 Management of SME, 
 Management, and 
 Regulatory Affairs.

The new Occupational Therapy bachelor's degree programme also started in 2011 The following year saw the first intake of students on the General Nursing bachelor programme, and on the Environmental and Sustainability Management, and Music Therapy master's degree programmes.

The Business Administration bachelor programme began in September 2014, followed by the International Wine Business bachelor programme in September 2015. The Digital Business Innovation and Transformation master's degree programme started in September 2017. 
Three new degree programmes started in autumn 2018: the English-language Applied Chemistry bachelor's degree programmes, and two master programmes, Advanced Nursing Practice and Applied Health Sciences.

One new degree programme was scheduled to begin in autumn 2019: the English-language bachelor's degree programme Informatics.

Research 

IMC Krems ’ research activities are funded by means of research grants and funding from companies. The Josef Ressel Centre for Personalised Therapy is an example of a research activity funded by such a grant. The Research Institute for Applied Bioanalytics and Drug Development focuses primarily on contract research for businesses. The CSR and innovation research group, part of the Department of Business, receives finance from a major research fund.

Awards 

 Spring 2016: IMC Krems received the highest rating in the categories student mobility, international academic staff and foreign language programmes in the EU-initiated U-Multirank global university ranking.. 
 Spring 2016: In the CHE ranking, the English-language Medical and Pharmaceutical Biotechnology bachelor's and master's degree programmes finished among the leaders 17 times in the various categories assessed. The ranking evaluated 300 universities and universities of applied sciences in the German-speaking countries according to a range of criteria.

Accreditations 

Evaluationsagentur Baden-Württemberg (evalag): IMC Krems’ internal quality management system has been awarded certification by evalag, an international quality assurance agency based in Baden-Württemberg, Germanhy.

Under the Hochschul-Qualitätssicherungsgesetz (Higher Education Quality Assurance Act), higher education institutes in Austria have to be externally audited at least every six years. 
ASIIN, an agency specialising in accreditation of engineering, IT, science and mathematics degree programmes, awarded its quality seal to IMC Krems’ Medical and Pharmaceutical Biotechnology programme. IMC Krems was the first Austrian university to receive ASIIN certification for one of its degrees.

See also
 List of Jesuit sites

External links 
 Homepage of the IMC University of Applied Sciences (in German and English)

Universities of Applied Sciences in Austria